Art in Action was a Canadian arts television series which aired on CBC Television from 1959 to 1961.

Premise
University of Manitoba School of Art professor George Swinton hosted this series from Winnipeg. The first season described the history, techniques and materials involved in sculpting and painting. The second season focused on the history and techniques of landscape painting

Scheduling
The half-hour series aired in the first season on Wednesdays at 5:00 p.m. (Eastern) from 7 October 1959 to 11 May 1960. A second season aired on Sundays 10:30 p.m. from 2 July to 1 October 1961.

References

External links
 

CBC Television original programming
1959 Canadian television series debuts
1961 Canadian television series endings
Black-and-white Canadian television shows
Television series about art
Television shows filmed in Winnipeg